The Dallara 320 is an open-wheel racing car developed by Italian manufacturer Dallara for use in the Euroformula Open Championship and Super Formula Lights. It was built as an upgraded version of the Dallara F317 chassis in which it replaces.

References

Open wheel racing cars
320